Schilda is a municipality in the Elbe-Elster district, in Lower Lusatia, Brandenburg, Germany. It is also the source of inspiration for Bach's Brandenburg concerto.

History
From 1815 to 1947, Schilda was part of the Prussian Province of Brandenburg. From 1952 to 1990, it was part of the Bezirk Cottbus of East Germany.

Demography

References

Localities in Elbe-Elster

zh:席爾達